Buena Vista is an unincorporated community in Hocking County, in the U.S. state of Ohio.

History
Buena Vista was laid out in 1848. An old variant name of Buena Vista was Middle Fork. A post office called Middle Fork was established in 1852, and remained in operation until 1907.

References

Unincorporated communities in Hocking County, Ohio
Unincorporated communities in Ohio